Slapstick is comedy involving exaggerated physical violence.

Slaptick may also refer to:

Operation Slapstick, a World War II military action
Slapstick (novel), by Kurt Vonnegut
Slapstick of Another Kind, a film adapted from the novel
Slapstick (instrument), a percussion instrument
Slapstick (comics), a Marvel superhero
Slapstick (band), a Chicago punk-ska band
 Slapstick (album)
Slapstick, also known as Robotrek, an SNES role-playing video game
 "Slapstick" (The Wire)

cs:Groteska (rozcestník)